Montagne or Montagné may refer to:

People
 Camille Montagne (1784–1866), French military physician and botanist. The standard author abbreviation Mont. (of Montagne) is used to indicate this individual as the author when citing a botanical name.
 Edward Montagne (1912-2003), American film and television director
 Joachim Havard de la Montagne (1927–2003), French composer and organist
 Gilbert Montagné (born 1957), French musician
 Michel de Montaigne (1533-1592), French philosopher
 Pierre de La Montagne (1755–1825), French playwright and poet
 Prosper Montagné (1865-1948), French chef and author
 Renée Montagne (born 1948), American radio journalist

Places
Montagne, Gironde, a commune in the Gironde department, France
Montagne, Isère, a commune in the Isère department, France
Montagne, Trentino, a commune in Trentino, Italy
Montagne Center, a basketball arena in Beaumont, Texas for Lamar University

See also

La Montagne (newspaper), French regional newspaper
La Montagne (disambiguation)
Montagnes (disambiguation)
Montaigne (disambiguation)